Rigging is both a noun, the equipment, and verb, the action of designing and installing the equipment, in the preparation to move objects. A team of riggers design and install the lifting or rolling equipment needed to raise, roll, slide or lift objects such as with a crane, hoist or block and tackle. 

Rigging comes from rig, to set up or prepare. Rigging is the equipment such as wire rope, turnbuckles, clevis, jacks used with cranes and other lifting equipment in material handling and structure relocation. Rigging systems commonly include shackles, master links and slings, and lifting bags in underwater lifting. 

In the United States the Occupational Safety and Health Administration (OSHA) regulates workplace safety including rigging in CFR 1926.251.

Equipment

Winch

Procedures

Safety

Gallery

See also

References

External links
 3.5 minute video on some basic cable rigging safety
 OSHA 1926.251 Rigging equipment for material handling
 what is rigging equipment

Material-handling equipment
Lifting equipment